Kevin C. Lano (born 1963) is a British computer scientist.

Life and work
Kevin Lano studied at the University of Reading, attaining a first class degree in Mathematics and Computer Science, and the University of Bristol where he completed his doctorate. He was an originator of formal object-oriented techniques (Z++), and developed a combination of UML and formal methods in a number of papers and books. He was one of the founders of the Precise UML group, who influenced the definition of UML 2.0. 
Lano published the book Advanced Systems Design with Java, UML and MDA (Butterworth-Heinemann) in 2005. He is also the editor of UML 2 Semantics and Applications, published by Wiley in October 2009, among a number of computer science books.

Lano was formerly a Research Officer at the Oxford University Computing Laboratory (now the Oxford University Department of Computer Science). He is a reader at the Department of Informatics at King's College London.

In 2008, Lano and his co-authors Andy Evans, Robert France, and Bernard Rumpe, were awarded the Ten Year Most Influential Paper Award at the MODELS 2008 Conference on Model Driven Engineering Languages and Systems for the 1998 paper "The UML as a Formal Modeling Notation".

Selected publications

Books
 Reverse Engineering and Software Maintenance (McGraw-Hill, 1993)
 Object-oriented Specification Case Studies (Prentice Hall, 1993)
 Formal Object-oriented Development (Springer, 1995)
 The B Language and Method: A Guide to Practical Formal Development (Springer, 1996)
 Software Design in Java 2 (Palgrave, 2002)
 UML 2 Semantics and Applications (Wiley, 2009), editor
 Model-Driven Development using UML and Java (Cengage, 2009)
 Agile MBD using UML-RSDS (Taylor & Francis, 2016)
 Financial Software Engineering (Springer, 2019), with Howard Haughton

References

External links
 Kevin Lano home page
 

1963 births
Living people
Alumni of the University of Reading
Alumni of the University of Bristol
English computer scientists
Formal methods people
Computer science writers
Members of the Department of Computer Science, University of Oxford
Academics of King's College London